Britain Simons is an American actor and influencer. He has garnered a following on a number of social media platforms, including TikTok. Also, known for his appearance on Disney's Descendants: School of Secrets appearing in 7 out of 23 episodes and having a minor part in the Lifetime original film Online Abduction (also known as Cyber Case), and playing the Badge Badger in the State Farm commercials. He began his professional career by doing commercials in 2014 in a local spot for Pappa Rollo's Pizza produced by Time Warner Cable while still attending university. He continued his career in Hollywood, CA by starring in independent films such as Surgey, television appearances on Disney Channel, Lifetime Television and Investigation Discovery, and commercials for Honda, War Dragons App, Toyota, State Farm, and Walmart.

In 2016, Britain performed the leading voiceover role of Daichi in the American English language version of Tsuburaya Productions feature film Ultraman X The Movie, the special 50th Ultra Series Anniversary theatrical feature film of Ultraman X. In 2020, he appeared in the episode "Sing, Sing, Sing" on the series Penny Dreadful: City of Angels on Showtime (TV network).

Early life and education 
Simons was born In Durango, Colorado to Kelly (Roelke), a photographer, and David Simons, a contractor and architect. He has one sibling, an older sister named Gentry Simons, who works in freelance marketing. His parents separated when he was four and relocated to Montrose, CO until he earned his high school diploma and moved away for college.

As a teen, Britain discovered community theatre and competitive speech team while preparing for a life as an engineer. He traveled to New York City, NY with the Carnegie Hall Singers, attended the National Youth Leadership Forum on National Security in Washington D.C., and earned his diploma from Montrose High School in 2010. He made the decision with his parents to pursue acting. From there, he received the Daniels Fund Scholarship to attend the university of his choice. He graduated with his Bachelor of Fine Arts degree in Theatre Studies from Baylor University, in Texas. He also attended the National Theater Institute at the Eugene O'Neill Theater Center in Waterford, Connecticut, NYC and he spent a short time in St. Petersburg, Russia with The St. Petersburg State Theater Arts Academy. After he moved to Hollywood he continued his training with John Kirby.

Career 
Simons has garnered a following of 65.5 thousand on TikTok and 35.5 thousand on Instagram. After he completed his formal education at Baylor University, in 2014, he began building a career in film, television and commercials in Los Angeles, CA. His first commercial appearances included Walmart's national Dare to Compare campaign, a Honda/BuzzFeed collaboration advert on Snapchat,  and an international commercial for Vivo's V3 smartphone. Soon to follow, he performed in the music video for Showtek - "90s by Nature" and a supporting role in Calum Scott's official music video for his release "Dancing on My Own".

Simons' television debut was in an appearance on the Lifetime Television movie Babysitter's Black Book with a single line as the food truck boy. Soon after he earned a supporting role in another Lifetime Television feature film Online Abduction (aka Cyber Case) (2015) alongside Brooke Butler, directed by Steven R. Monroe. He made appearances in shows like Murder Book (2015), Unusual Suspects (2015), and Disney's Descendants: School of Secrets (2015) playing Prince Ben, premiering online and the Disney Channel in support of the movie summer event, Descendants.

After less than two years in Hollywood, Britain began landing credited supporting roles in indie and major feature films. In 2016, he landed the supporting role of Handsome Boy in the critically acclaimed horror film, Holidays directed by Kevin Kolsch. He also performed the leading voice-over role of Daichi in the Ultraman 50th anniversary feature film Ultraman X The Movie.

Britain can also been seen in his comedic commercial spots for the War Dragons App, his most recent role of Peter Parker aka Spider-Man in the new unofficial web series Superheroes in Therapy, along with his commercial spots for State Farm where he plays the Badge Badger. In 2020, he played the role of "Assistant" to Jerome Townsend on the new Showtime (TV network) series, Penny Dreadful: City of Angels.

Filmography

Commercials

Film

Television

Music Video

References

External links
 
 
 
 
 iSpot TV Commercials

1991 births
Living people
People from Durango, Colorado
American male television actors
Baylor University alumni
Male actors from Colorado
People from Montrose, Colorado